The Piano Teacher is a 2001 erotic psychological drama film written and directed by Michael Haneke, based on the 1983 novel of the same name by Elfriede Jelinek. It tells the story of an unmarried piano teacher (Isabelle Huppert) at a Vienna conservatory, living with her mother (Annie Girardot) in a state of emotional and sexual disequilibrium, who enters into a sadomasochistic relationship with her student (Benoît Magimel). A co-production of Austria and France, Haneke was given the opportunity to direct after previous attempts to adapt the novel by filmmakers Valie Export and Paulus Manker collapsed for financial reasons.

At the 2001 Cannes Film Festival, it won the Grand Prix; the two leads, Huppert and Magimel, won Best Actress and Best Actor. It went on to receive positive reviews and other awards and nominations.

Plot
Erika Kohut is a piano professor in her late 30s at a Vienna music conservatory who resides in an apartment with her domineering elderly mother. Her late father had been a longstanding resident in a psychiatric asylum. Despite Erika's aloof and assured façade, she is a woman whose sexual repression and loneliness is manifested in her paraphilia, including voyeurism, sadomasochistic fetishes, and self-mutilation.

At a recital hosted by the Blonskij couple, Erika meets Walter Klemmer, a young aspiring engineer who also plays piano, and who expresses admiration of her talent for classical music. The two share an appreciation for composers Robert Schumann and Franz Schubert, and he attempts to apply to the conservatory to be her pupil. His audition impresses the other professors, but Erika, though visibly moved by his playing, votes against him; she cites his divergent interpretation of Schubert's Andantino, and questions his motivations. Despite this, Walter is admitted as Erika's pupil. Meanwhile, another pupil, Anna Schober, struggles with anxiety while pushed by her own ambitious mother. However, when Erika witnesses Anna and Walter socializing, she slips to an empty coatroom and smashes a glass, hiding the shards inside one of Anna's coat pockets. This cuts Anna's right hand, preventing her playing at the forthcoming jubilee concert.

Walter pursues Erika into a lavatory after she secretly injured Anna. Walter passionately kisses Erika, and she responds by repeatedly humiliating and frustrating him. She proceeds to give him a handjob before performing fellatio on him, but abruptly stops when he does not abide by her orders to be silent and to look at her and not to touch her. She tells him she will write him a letter regarding their next meeting. Later at the conservatory, Erika feigns sympathy for Anna's mother, with Erika saying only she can substitute for Anna in the upcoming school concert at such a late stage.

Walter is increasingly insistent in his desire to initiate a sexual relationship with Erika, but Erika is only willing if he will satisfy her masochistic fantasies. She gives him the letter indicating acts she will consent to. He follows her home and reads the letter in her bedroom, but the list repulses him and he leaves. Later that night, Erika’s mother is berating her while they lay in bed together for letting Walter in her bedroom in the middle of the night, when Erika suddenly begins kissing and groping her mother. Her mother resists and tells Erika she is unwell.

Erika finds Walter at an ice rink after his hockey practice to apologize. She begins to subjugate herself to him in a janitorial closet. Walter says he loves her and they begin to have sex, but Erika is unable to, and vomits while performing fellatio. Later that night, Walter arrives at Erika's apartment and attacks her in the fashion described in her letter. He locks her mother away in her bedroom before proceeding to beat and rape Erika.

The next day, Erika brings a large kitchen knife to the concert where she is scheduled to substitute for Anna. When Walter arrives, he enters cheerfully, laughing with his family, and flippantly greets her. Moments before the concert is due to start, a distraught Erika calmly stabs herself in the shoulder with the kitchen knife and exits the concert hall into the street.

Cast

Isabelle Huppert as Erika Kohut
Benoît Magimel as Walter Klemmer
Annie Girardot as The Mother
Susanne Lothar as Mrs. Schober
Udo Samel as Dr. Blonskij
Anna Sigalevitch as Anna Schober
Cornelia Köndgen as Mme Blonskij

Production

Development

The film is based on the 1983 novel The Piano Teacher by Elfriede Jelinek, who won the 2004 Nobel Prize in Literature. Director Michael Haneke read The Piano Teacher when it was published and aspired to adapt it to transition from making television films to cinema. However, Haneke learned Jelinek and Valie Export had already adapted a screenplay, a project aborted due to lack of investment. Jelinek later abandoned hope for a film version before selling the rights to Paulus Manker, who asked Haneke to adapt the screenplay, though Haneke would not be the director. Manker did not secure a budget, so the producer asked Haneke to direct.

Haneke agreed to take over the directorial helm, though the screenplay had been written with Manker's direction in mind, only if Isabelle Huppert was the star. Haneke also reorganized the novel's story, and developed the characters of Anna Schober and her mother to mirror the Kohutsc mother–daughter relationship at a past stage. In pre-production, Haneke followed Jelinek's choices in costumes, including pleated skirts and Burberry trench coats common in Vienna conservatories.

Casting
Haneke had previously reached out to Huppert to star in his film Funny Games (1997), which she passed on for another professional conflict. When Haneke told her he would not direct The Piano Teacher without her, Huppert skimmed the screenplay and realized its potential. She said she had studied piano as a child, quitting when she was 15, but began playing again for the film. Eva Green has an uncredited role as one of Walter’s friends.

Filming
Filming began on 21 August 2000 and ended on 28 October 2000.

For the scene in which Erika cuts herself in the bathtub, tubes and a pump were used for the false blood, which the props artist had to conceal from the camera under Huppert. Huppert also wore a blood bag under her clothing for the self-stabbing scene, taken from the novel. Benoît Magimel studied piano during filming to convincingly simulate his playing scenes at the end of production, while the music is playback. Susanne Lothar performed in German, but her lines were dubbed over with French in co-production.

Reception

Critical reception
On review aggregator Rotten Tomatoes, the film has an approval rating of 73% based on 89 reviews, with an average rating of 7.00/10. The website's critical consensus reads, "Though it makes for rather unpleasant viewing, The Piano Teacher is a riveting and powerful psychosexual drama." Roger Ebert awarded it three and a half stars, citing Huppert's confidence, writing on hints of revenge against The Mother character and defending the ending, saying "with a film like this any conventional ending would be a cop-out". Peter Bradshaw credited Haneke for aptitude in creating "nerve-jangling disquiet" and Huppert for "the performance of her career". David Denby praised the film as "audaciously brilliant".

In 2017, Los Angeles Times critic Justin Chang recalled The Piano Teacher as Huppert's best work in a Haneke film, and "a major achievement in a disturbingly minor key". Mick LaSalle credited Huppert for "a rich incarnation of a woman we might see on the street and never guess that she contains fires, earthquakes and infernos", comparing it to her in the 2016 film Elle.

Accolades
The Piano Teacher won awards on the European circuit, most notably the Grand Prix at the 2001 Cannes Film Festival, with the two leads, Huppert and Magimel, winning Best Actress and Best Actor. The film was Austria's submission for the Academy Award for Best Foreign Language Film, but it was not nominated.

See also
 Isabelle Huppert on screen and stage
 Sadism and masochism in fiction
 List of submissions to the 74th Academy Awards for Best Foreign Language Film
 List of Austrian submissions for the Academy Award for Best Foreign Language Film

References

External links
 
 
 
 
 
 The Piano Teacher: Bad Romances, an essay by Moira Weigel at the Criterion Collection

2001 films
2001 drama films
2001 independent films
2001 multilingual films
2000s erotic drama films
2000s French-language films
2000s German-language films
2000s psychological drama films
Arte France Cinéma films
Austrian drama films
Austrian independent films
Austrian multilingual films
BDSM in films
Cannes Grand Prix winners
Films about classical music and musicians
Films about pianos and pianists
Films about rape
Films about scandalous teacher–student relationships
Films about self-harm
Films about sexual repression
Films based on Austrian novels
Films directed by Michael Haneke
Films set in Vienna
Films shot in Vienna
French erotic drama films
French independent films
French psychological drama films
French multilingual films
German erotic drama films
German independent films
German multilingual films
German psychological drama films
Films about mother–daughter relationships
2000s French films
2000s German films